The Even Dozen Jug Band was founded in 1963 by Stefan Grossman (solo country blues and ragtime guitarist) and Peter Siegel (roots-based guitarist and producer) in New York City, New York. Other members were David Grisman (a noted mandolinist), Steve Katz (later with Blues Project and Blood, Sweat and Tears), Maria Muldaur (then Maria D'Amato), Joshua Rifkin (arranger of Scott Joplin ragtime compositions,), and John Sebastian (later with the Lovin' Spoonful).

The Even Dozen Jug Band only existed for a short time.  Their only recording was the self-titled album, The Even Dozen Jug Band, issued in January 1964 on the Elektra label.

They made a couple of television appearances and performed several times in concert, twice at New York's Carnegie Hall.

References

External links
 Even Dozen Jug Band discography
 Richie Unterberger's liner notes to CD reissue

Rock music groups from New York (state)
American folk rock groups
Musical groups from New York (state)
Elektra Records artists